Moratock Park is a public park in Danbury, North Carolina that includes the site of Moratock Iron Furnace. Union cavalry, under the command of George Stoneman, destroyed most of the original foundryworks while conducting raids through the area in 1865 during the American Civil War.

It was added to the National Register of Historic Places in 1974.

Gallery

References

Further reading
Berrier, Kyle A.  Around Walnut Cove and Danbury: Kyle A. Berrier.  Charleston, SC:  Arcadia Publishing, 2014.
"North Carolina:  Stoneman's Raid", Civil War Traveler, 2009.

External links
 Map showing Stoneman's raid and Moratock in PDF format

1843 establishments in North Carolina
Buildings and structures in Stokes County, North Carolina
Foundries in the United States
Industrial buildings and structures on the National Register of Historic Places in North Carolina
Industrial buildings completed in 1843
National Register of Historic Places in Stokes County, North Carolina
Parks in North Carolina
Protected areas of Stokes County, North Carolina